The Dalton Cache–Pleasant Camp Border Crossing connects the towns of Haines, Alaska and Haines Junction, Yukon on the Canada–United States border. Alaska Route 7 on the American side joins Yukon Highway 3 on the Canadian side as part of the Haines Highway.

Route
In 1890, Jack Dalton of Skagway improved an historic trail to the interior of Alaska and on to the contiguous United States established by the Chilikat tribe of the Indigenous peoples of the Pacific Northwest Coast. The route, formerly known as the Dalton Trail, had been used for centuries by the indigenous people of the region and was heavily used during the Klondike Gold Rush. Dalton Cache was an inn and trading post at the border. In 2009, Haines Highway was declared a National Scenic Byway.

Canadian side
In response to the goldrush, the North-West Mounted Police (NWMP) established an inspection station in 1898 just across the border from Dalton Cache at Pleasant Camp. The functions included collecting customs duties. It is unclear if the officers in charge were wholly NWMP members. In 1901, the office was placed under the administrative oversight of Whitehorse Customs but closed in 1906. The building remained part of the NWMP compound. Canada established a permanent border station at Pleasant Camp in 1946.

US side
Prior to 1986, US Border Inspections were conducted at Haines, which was recognized as inefficient since many people lived and worked between the town and the border  to the north. Construction of the US Border Inspection Station at Dalton Cache involved rehabilitating the historic structures at the border.

See also
 List of Canada–United States border crossings

References

Buildings and structures in British Columbia
Buildings and structures in Haines Borough, Alaska
Canada–United States border crossings
1946 establishments in Alaska
1946 establishments in British Columbia